Kunjakheda  is an Indian village in Kumbhraj. It is located in the Guna district, Madhya Pradesh. As of the 2011 census, it has a population of 491.

References

Villages in Guna district